Urban Duniam (born 29 May 1931) is a former  Australian rules footballer who played with South Melbourne in the Victorian Football League (VFL).

Notes

External links 

Living people
1931 births
Australian rules footballers from Victoria (Australia)
Sydney Swans players